Platinum bromide is the chemical compound with the formula PtBr2.  This dark green powder is a common precursor to other platinum-bromide compounds.  Like palladium chloride and palladium(II) bromide, it is a compound that dissolves only in coordinating solvents or in the presence of donor ligands.

Illustrative use
Transition metal carbene complexes of platinum can be prepared by heating platinum bromide with the imidazolium salt NHC precursors and sodium acetate in dimethyl sulfoxide.

References

Bromides,2
Bromides
Platinum group halides